Associate may refer to:

Academics 
 Associate degree, a two-year educational degree in the United States, and some areas of Canada
 Associate professor, an academic rank at a college or university 
 Technical associate or Senmonshi, a Japanese educational degree
 Associate of the Royal College of Science, an honorary degree-equivalent award presented by Imperial College London
 Teaching associate, an academic teaching position usually requiring a graduate degree
 Research associate, an academic research position usually requiring a graduate degree

Business 
 Employee
 Business partner
 Associate, an independent (often self-employed) person working as if directly employed by a company
 Associate company, an accounting and business valuation concept
 Coworker, a  partner or colleague in business or at work.

Health care 
 Clinical research associate (CRA), a clinical trial monitor which oversees the conduct of clinical trials in study sites and helps protecting study subjects rights and safety
 Clinical Associate (Psychology), a specialist regulated mental health professional in Scotland
 Clinical associates, a category of healthcare providers in South Africa

Law 
 Associate attorney, an employee lawyer in a traditional United States law firm
 Associate justice, a member of a judicial panel who is not the chief justice
 Judge's associate, an assistant to a judge in an Australian court (akin to a judge's clerk in an American court)

Entertainment 
 The Associates (band), a Scottish post-punk and New Wave band of the early 1980s
 The Associate (1946 film), a Mexican drama film
 The Associate (1979 film), a comedy film directed by René Gainville
 The Associate (1996 film), a film starring Whoopi Goldberg
 The Associate (soundtrack), a 1996 original soundtrack album
 The Associate (novel), a 2009 novel by John Grisham
 The Associates (U.S. TV series), an American sitcom in 1979 and 1980
 The Associates (Canadian TV series), a Canadian drama TV series in 2001 and 2002

Other uses 
 Associate, to form an Association or connection between two or more concepts in the mind or imagination
 Associate (ring theory), a mathematical concept
 Associate, a person who is in league with the Mafia but is not a made man (full member)

See also 
 Association (disambiguation)